Richard Bryant may refer to:

 Richard Bryant (actor) (born 1984), American actor who has appeared in Army Wives
 Richard Bryant (New South Wales cricketer) (1847–1931), Australian cricketer
 Richard Bryant (Western Australia cricketer) (1904–1989), Australian cricketer
 Richard Bryant (photographer) (born 1947), British architectural photographer
 Richard Bryant (musician), formerly of The Doobie Brothers and Little River Band
 Rick Bryant (1948–2019), New Zealand blues singer/songwriter
 Richard Bryant (psychologist) (born 1960), Australian medical scientist